The Norwegian Union of Bookbinders and Cardboard Workers (NBKF) was a trade union representing workers involved in bookbinding and manufacturing packaging in Norway.

The union was founded on 1 January 1898, and it affiliated to the Norwegian Confederation of Trade Unions in 1900.  By 1924, it had 1,246 members, and by 1963, this had grown to 4,556.  In 1930, it adopted its final name.  In 1967, it merged with the Norwegian Lithographic and Chemographic Union and the Norwegian Union of Typographers, to form the Norwegian Graphical Union.

Presidents
1899: Harald Jensen
1902: Aug. Gunersen
1906: A. Steinhauser
1911: Lorentz E. Svendsen
1914: Hans Aas
1930: Øistein Marthinsen
1953: Johan M. Bøe

References

Defunct trade unions of Norway
Norwegian Confederation of Trade Unions
1898 establishments in Norway
Bookbinders' trade unions
Trade unions established in 1898
Trade unions disestablished in 1967